Razhden Rolandiyevich Melkadze (born 4 December 1983) is a former Russian professional football player of Georgian descent.

Club career
He played 2 seasons in the Russian Football National League for FC Arsenal Tula, FC Dynamo Bryansk and FC Oryol.

External links
 

1983 births
Russian sportspeople of Georgian descent
Living people
Russian footballers
FC Oryol players
FC Arsenal Tula players
Association football defenders
FC Dynamo Bryansk players
FC Sever Murmansk players